Pouilley-Français is a commune in the Doubs department in the Bourgogne-Franche-Comté region in eastern France. This village is close to the Jura and Haute-Saône departments.

Geography 

Population

Transportation 
The railroad line from Besançon to Dole and the A36 motorway cross the territory of the commune.

See also
 Communes of the Doubs department

References

External links

 Pouilley-Français on the intercommunal Web site of the department 

Communes of Doubs